Saif al-Islam al-Masri is the name of a certain member of al-Qaeda. The name is probably, but not certainly, a nom de guerre; Saif al-Islam means Sword of Islam and al-Masri means the Egyptian, but either or both could be a real name. Little is publicly known about this person, but his name has come up in reports and testimony on a variety of major terrorist attacks and related paramilitary and financial activities. According to those sources, Saif al-Islam
was one of fifteen men—all Arabs—captured in the Pankisi Gorge in a joint operation by Georgian and American Special Forces, in early October 2002
was until then a member of al-Qaeda's majlis al-shura and its military committee
was handed over to the Americans
ran the Jihad Wal training camp near Khost, Afghanistan in 1992
had been an officer of the Chechnya branch of the terrorist charity Benevolence International Foundation
fought against American forces in Somalia
instructed Ali Mohamed to get training from Hezbollah in south Lebanon.

References

Egyptian al-Qaeda members
Living people
Year of birth missing (living people)